Steff Gaulter (born 1976 in Sway, Hampshire) is an English weather forecaster for Al Jazeera English.

Gaulter won a place at University of Cambridge in 1994 where she was awarded an MA in Physics, gaining the University's top marks for the final year presentation project.  While studying, she also broadcast on hospital radio, which forged her interest in weather broadcasting.

On graduation she taught GCSE and A-Level Physics and Maths - spending one summer teaching in Uganda.  She then became a trainer of Scientific Instruments at seminars and workshops throughout the UK, specialising in Ellipsometry - a non-destructive form of surface analysis.

In 1999 she joined the Met Office, qualifying as a fully trained forecaster, becoming the first person to be awarded a distinction in her final forecasting exam.  While at the Met Office she worked at BBC Bristol, presenting on regional radio covering Swindon Sound, Wiltshire Sound, and Somerset Sound; and on television on Points West and a week on BBC South.  She also used to host a weather slot on Monday and Friday for a friend at Bath FM.

Gaulter joined Sky News as a weather forecaster in November 2002, particularly enjoying external broadcasts from the Cheltenham Festival, the FA Cup Final from Cardiff and from the Glastonbury Festival.

Gaulter was subsequently recruited by Al Jazeera and has been presenting the weather on Al Jazeera English since the channel's launch in November 2006.

Personal life
Steff got married in Argentina. and has a son named Mylo. Gaulter enjoys music, playing the viola, but also has a keen interest in live bands.  Steff's other interest is travel, particularly to less popular destinations including Latvia, and Russia.  She has one sister, Vicky, and an older brother, Mark.

References

External links
Personal website
Short bio at Al Jazeera English
Older short bio at Al Jazeera English via Web Archive (page contains other bios as well)
TV Newsroom Q&A

Al Jazeera people
1976 births
Living people
British people of Swiss descent
People from New Forest District
English meteorologists
Sky News weather forecasters
Alumni of the University of Cambridge